The Three Mannequins is a 1926 German silent film directed by Jaap Speyer and starring Hans Albers, Anton Pointner, and Paul Graetz. It was shot at the Terra Studios in Berlin. The film's sets were designed by the art director Hans Jacoby. It premiered at Berlin's Marmorhaus.

Cast

References

Bibliography

External links 
 

1926 films
Films of the Weimar Republic
German silent feature films
Films directed by Jaap Speyer
Terra Film films
German black-and-white films
1920s German films
Films shot at Terra Studios